The Global Invasive Species Information Network (GISIN) is a web-based network of data providers including government, non-government, non-profit, educational, and other organizations that agree to work together to provide increased access to data and information on invasive species around the world.

Computer-based information systems like those in the GISIN present specific information to help detect, rapidly respond to, and control invasive alien species, flora or fauna.

Projects
As of June 2008, work is proceeding on a draft of a proposed GISIN data-sharing protocol.

See also
 Invasive Species Compendium
List of the world's 100 worst invasive species
Island Conservation

References

External links
 Official Global Invasive Species Information Network website 
 Draft GISIN protocol 
 Draft GISIN technical site (specific data-sharing tools)
 Participants in the 2008 GISIN technical workshop (Athens, Georgia, USA)

Invasive species
American environmental websites
International environmental organizations